Ameletus vernalis is a species of combmouthed minnow mayfly in the family Ameletidae. It is found in southwestern Canada and the western United States.

References

Mayflies
Articles created by Qbugbot
Insects described in 1924